Steven D. Wexner is an American surgeon and physician. He is Director of the Ellen Leifer Shulman and Steven Shulman Digestive Disease Center at Cleveland Clinic Florida.  Wexner has received numerous regional, national, and international research awards. Through his multiple academic appointments, Wexner personally trains 15-20 surgeons each year, and he educates thousands more around the world through conferences and lectures. He maintains an exceptionally busy clinical practice and innovative cutting-edge research. He is a resource for his colleagues from around the world for referral of patients with challenging or complex problems. In 2020, he was elected Vice-Chair of the Board of Regents of the American College of Surgeons for a one year term. Since 1990. he has served as Symposium Director of the Cleveland Clinic Annual International Colorectal Disease Symposium. The Symposium was held in Fort Lauderdale or Boca Raton every year from 1990 to 2019. Since 2020, the Symposium has expanded to include host locations outside of the USA with interruptions during the pandemic years of 2021-2022.

Education 
Wexner received his bachelor's degree from Columbia University in 1978. He earned his MD in 1982 from Weill Cornell Medicine. He completed a general surgery residency in 1987 at Roosevelt Hospital (now Mount Sinai West). In 1988 he completed a fellowship in colon and rectal surgery at the University of Minnesota Medical School in Minneapolis, MN.

Career 

In 1993, Wexner was named Chairman of the Department of Colorectal Surgery at Cleveland Clinic Florida. While at Cleveland Clinic he also served as Chairman of the Division of Research and Education from 1996 to 2007, as well as Chief of Staff from 1997 to 2007. He served as Chief Academic Officer from 2007 to 2012. In 2012 He was appointed the Director of the Digestive Diseases Center.

Wexner holds academic appointments as Affiliate Professor at Florida Atlantic University; Clinical Professor at Florida International University; Affiliate Professor of Surgery at the University of South Florida, Tampa, Florida; Clinical Professor of Surgery at the Cleveland Clinic Lerner College of Medicine of Case Western Reserve University; Affiliate Professor of Surgery at the University of Miami Miller School of Medicine; Professor of Surgery, University of Siena, Siena, Italy; Visiting Professor, Faculty of Medicine, the Hebrew University of Jerusalem, Hadassah Medical Center, Jerusalem, Israel; and Visiting Professor at the University of Belgrade in Serbia.

As a founder of the National Accreditation Program for Rectal Cancer (NAPRC). he led a multi-faceted coalition to establish the accreditation program with the American College of Surgeon's Commission on Cancer. The NAPRC's goal is to implement nationwide educational and medical standards for the best treatment of rectal cancer.

Innovation  and research 

In 2022, Cleveland Clinic Florida received a $5 million gift to fund Wexner's research. In recognition of their generous contribution, Cleveland Clinic Weston recognized the Shulmans by naming the Digestive Disease Center the Ellen Leifer Shulman and Steven Shulman Digestive Disease Center.

In an interview with Local 10, Wexner shared that he has been seeing a higher frequency of colorectal cancer in younger patients, due to genetic drift as well as environmental and dietary factors. This is often misdiagnosed until the disease has become advanced, and so Wexner recommends beginning regular colonoscopy screenings earlier than guidelines currently advise.

J-Pouch Procedures
Much of Wexner's work has been focused on improving surgical techniques for the avoidance of permanent stomas in patients with colorectal cancer, ulcerative colitis, and fecal incontinence. He introduced a popular modification to the technique for creating an ileo-anal pouch , or j-pouch for ulcerative colitis, in which double stapling is used in place of sutures to improve results. He also popularized the colonic j-pouch for patients with rectal cancer. The J-pouch, an alternative to a permanent ileostomy or colostomy, allows patients who have had their colons removed to continue to have regular bowel movements without an ostomy bag. This is now the standard of care for patients with rectal carcinoma across the country and world.

Incontinence and Constipation Scores
The Wexner Incontinence Score is the most common score used to determine the severity of incontinence before and after surgery for anal incontinence. The Wexner Incontinence Score is based on the research of Wexner and his associate J. Marcio N. Jorge, MD. The scoring system takes into account the frequency of incontinence, alterations a patient makes to cope with incontinence, and lifestyle modifications.

Wexner's research has also developed the Wexner Constipation Score, occasionally known as the Cleveland Clinic Constipation Score.[7] The score measures the severity of constipation by taking into consideration a number of factors, which his research found to correlate with objective physiologic findings. Information on these factors is collected from each patient's subjective reports, and they are given a score. This score allows for appropriate and consistent diagnosis and treatment. The factors include the frequency and completeness of bowel movements, the difficulty of evacuation, the type of assistance used (if any), the patient's level of pain, and duration of constipation.

In 1996, Wexner and colleagues released a method of scoring perianal disease activity for patients with Crohn's Disease. The goal of the scoring system is to utilize  a patient's medical history and the results of physical examination to predict the likelihood of success of surgical intervention. Prior to the development of this method, doctors lacked reliable indices of disease activity or prognostic implications from surgery.

Patents

Honors and awards 

In 1999, Wexner  was awarded an FRCS from the Royal College of Surgeons in Edinburgh, Scotland. In 2000 he was awarded an FRCS ad eundum from the Royal College of Surgeons in England. In 2008 he was elected to the Royal College of Surgeons of England by a unanimous vote of its council. This is the highest distinction conferred by the council. In 2015, Wexner was awarded honorary membership in the European Surgical Association and the European Society of Coloproctology.

In 2013, Wexner was awarded an honorary foreign membership in the Argentina Society of Coloproctology. In 2012, Wexner was awarded the degree of PhD honoris causa by the University of Belgrade. In 2003, The American Jewish Committee presented Wexner with the prestigious Maimonides Award.  In 2013, he was awarded Professor Emeritus of I.M. Sechenov First Moscow State Medical University.  In 2016, Wexner was recognized by Cleveland Clinic Florida as a Master Clinician.

In 2017, Wexner was awarded an honorary membership into the Society of General Surgery of Peru, honorary fellowship in the Royal College of Surgeons in Ireland, and Honorary Clinical Senior Lecturer at the University College London.  In 2019, Wexner was awarded an Honorary Fellowship by the Royal College of Physicians and Surgeons of Glasgow, Scotland. Wexner was elected as an Honorary Fellow of the Royal College of Surgeons of England in 2022. 

In 2022, Wexner was appointed as a Visiting Professor in the Department of Surgery and Cancer at Imperial College London and Honorary Consultant at Imperial College Healthcare NHS Trust.

Professional memberships and positions 

As of October 2020, Wexner is Vice-Chair of the Board of Regents of the American College of Surgeons. Through this position he also serves as Vice-Chair of the Executive Committee of the Board of Regents, the Vice-Chair of the Finance Committee of the ACS, and the Regental Liaison to the ACS Board of Governors.

From 2011 to 2012, Wexner served as president of the American Society of Colon and Rectal Surgeons, for which he gave a Presidential Address in 2012. Prior to that, from 2010 to 2011 he served as president of the American Board of Colon and Rectal Surgery. He also served as president of the Society of American Gastrointestinal and Endoscopic Surgeons (SAGES) from 2006 to 2007. In 2007 he delivered the SAGES Presidential Address entitled "Trials and tribulations in the history of surgical innovation."

Additionally, Wexner served on the Board of Regents of the American College of Surgeons from 2012-2021. Within this organization he is on the executive committee for the Commission on Cancer, and he is the chair of the National Accreditation Program for Rectal Cancer.

Wexner has served as the president of other professional organizations, including the American Society of Colon and Rectal Surgeons Research Foundation, the Florida Gastroenterologic Society, and South Florida Chapter of the American College of Surgeons. In addition to being licensed in the United States, Wexner is licensed in the United Kingdom with the General Medical Council and he is listed as a Colorectal Surgeon on the specialist register.

Publications 

Wexner is the co-editor-in-chief of Surgery. He has served on the editorial team for over 25 textbooks and has published 250 textbook chapters. He is a reviewer for 31 journals and is on 33 editorial boards. Wexner has authored numerous articles over his career. 

In 2019, the Journal of Coloproctology published an analysis of the top 100 cited papers in benign anorectal disease which listed Wexner as the second most cited author. His paper with Marcio Jorge,  was ranked as the most cited paper on benign anorectal disease.

On October 19, 2021, Elsevier published a list of the top cited scientists from 22 different fields based on the Scopus database. In the field of surgery, Wexner was ranked as the 34th most cited author of all time. In the field of Colorectal Surgery, Wexner is the 3rd most cited author of all time and the most cited living author. 

In his capacity as Regent for the American College of Surgeons, Wexner has also conducted a series of interviews with other surgeons from around the world called A Surgeon's Voice. The interviews focus on these surgeons' experiences with the COVID-19 pandemic and their unique perspectives as medical professionals. He has produced over 100 videos which have received over 300,000 views, as of May 2020. This series includes an interview with Johnson & Johnson CEO, Alex Gorsky, on the process of developing their COVID-19 vaccine.

Wexner also published studies which resulted in the eponymous Wexner Incontinence Score and the Wexner Constipation Score, as well as the Pilarsky Wexner Perianal Crohn's Score:

Selected books 

 S.R. Steele, J.A. Maykel, S.D. Wexner (Eds.), (2020). Clinical Decision Making in Colorectal Surgery, 2nd ed. Springer Nature Switzerland. 
 David E. Beck (Author), Steven D. Wexner (Author), Janice F. Rafferty (Author) (2019). Gordon and Nivatvongs' Principles and Practice of Surgery for the Colon, Rectum, and Anus, 4th ed. Thieme. 
 David E. Beck, Scott R. Steele, Steven D. Wexner (2019). Fundamentals of Anorectal Surgery, 3rd ed. Springer Nature Switzerland. 
 Steven D. Wexner (Author), James W. Fleshman (Author) (2019). Colon and Rectal Surgery: Abdominal Operations (Master Techniques in Surgery), 2nd ed. Wolters Kluwer. 
 Steven D. Wexner (Author), James W. Fleshman (Author) (2019). Colon and Rectal Surgery: Anorectal Operations (Master Techniques in Surgery), 2nd ed. Wolters Kluwer. 
 David E. Beck, Steven D. Wexner, et al. (2014). The ASCRS Manual of Colon and Rectal Surgery, 2nd ed. Springer New York. 
 Andrew P. Zbar, Robert D. Madoff, Steven D. Wexner (2013). Reconstructive Surgery of the Rectum, Anus and Perineum. Springer. 
 Steven D. Wexner,  Andrew P. Zbar, Mario Pescatori (2010). Complex Anorectal Disorders: Investigation and Management. Springer. 
  Andrew P. Zbar, Steven D. Wexner (2010). Coloproctology (Springer Specialist Surgery Series). Springer. 
 N. Stollman, Steven D. Wexner (2007). Disease of the Colon, 1st ed. Informa Healthcare. 
 Steven D. Wexner, Graeme S. Duthrie (2006). Constipation: Etiology, Evaluation and Management. Springer.  
 G. Davila, G. Ghoneim G, Steven D. Wexner (2006). Pelvic Floor Dysfunction, 1st ed. Springer. 
 Steven D. Wexner et al. (2006). Diverticular Disease: Emerging Evidence in  Common Conditions, 1st ed. Springer. 
 Steven D. Wexner, Andrew P. Zbar, Mario Pescatori (2005). Complex Anorectal Disorders. Investigation and Management, 1st ed. Springer. 
 Steven D. Wexner (Section Ed.), B. MacFadyen (Section Ed.) (2004). Laparoscopic Surgery of the Abdomen. Springer-Verlag. 
 P. Boulos, Steven D. Wexner (2000). Current Challenges in Colorectal Surgery, 1st ed. W. B. Saunders. 
 Steven D. Wexner, (1999). Protocols in General Surgery: Laparoscopic Colorectal Surgery.

Selected articles 

As noted above, Wexner has published a myriad of articles in scientific journals and books, including over 780 manuscripts and 26 editorials or commentaries in the last twenty years.
 Most recently, he co-authored the following noteworthy articles on COVID, on the contributions of women to the field of colorectal surgery, and on racial disparities in colorectal surgery outcomes:

AIS Channel 

Wexner is a contributor for the AIS (Advances in Surgery) Channel, a leading global educational platform providing training and networking for surgeons. Since 2014, AIS has provided audiovisual recordings and broadcasts of procedures, techniques, and new developments in the world of surgery. AIS works with a constantly growing network of hospitals and key opinion leaders and validating academic and scientific societies. Wexner has been involved in dozens of broadcasts with topics ranging from robotic colorectal surgery teaching techniques to discussing diversity, equity, and inclusion issues in healthcare.

Personal life 

Wexner's father was Judge Ira Wexner, who presided in New York for over twenty years and lived part time in West Boca. Wexner's spouse, Mariana Berho, M.D., is Chief of Staff at Cleveland Clinic Weston and also serves on the Board of Governors and Board of Trustees at the parent organization, Cleveland Clinic.

References

External links
List of publications on PubMed

Living people
American surgeons
Cleveland Clinic people
Weill Cornell Medical College alumni
University of Minnesota Medical School alumni
Year of birth missing (living people)
Fellows of the Royal College of Surgeons
Fellows of the Royal College of Surgeons of Edinburgh
Fellows of the American College of Surgeons